The Polish question ( or ) was the issue, in international politics, of the existence of Poland as an independent state. Raised soon after the partitions of Poland in the late 18th century, it became a question current in European and American diplomacy throughout the 19th and parts of the 20th centuries. Historian Norman Davies notes that the Polish question is the primary lens through which most histories of Europe discuss the history of Poland, and was one of the most common topics of European politics for close to two centuries. The Polish question was a major topic at all major European peace conferences: at the Congress of Vienna in 1815, at the Versailles Conference in 1919, and at the Yalta Conference and the Potsdam Conference in 1945. As Piotr Wandycz writes, "What to the Poles was the Polish cause, to the outside world was the Polish question."

History
After late-18th-century partitions of Poland, the Polish–Lithuanian Commonwealth ceased to exist, divided between the Austrian Empire, the Prussian Kingdom and the Russian Empire. Poland’s erasure from Europe became a key to maintaining the European balance of power over the next century. The term "Polish question" came into use shortly afterwards, as some Great Powers took interest in upsetting this status quo, hoping to benefit from the recreation of the Polish state, starting with France under Napoleon Bonaparte, who considered the Poles useful recruits in his wars with Poland's occupying powers. The term "Polish question" was heard again after the failed November Uprising of 1831, during the "Spring of Nations" in 1848–49, and again after the unsuccessful January Uprising of 1863, in which Poles and Lithuanians rebelled against the Russian Empire, trying to restore their country's independence. In the era of rising nationalism, the question of whether an independent Poland should be restored, and also what it meant to be a Pole, gained increasing notoriety. In the decades that followed, the term became less used, as no new major uprisings occurred in Poland to draw the world's attention. The issue was further assuaged by the fact that the three partitioning powers were common allies for over a century (cf. League of the Three Emperors), and their diplomacy successfully kept the issue suppressed so that no serious solution appeared in sight. Out of the three partitioning powers, for Prussia the Polish question was one of fundamental importance, as Prussia's existence was connected to the Polish state being vanquished.

The Polish question resurfaced with force during World War I, when the partitioning powers fought one another, leading them to attempts to court their respective Polish citizens. In his memorandum of 20 January 1914, Russian Foreign Minister Sazonov proposed the restoration of an autonomous Kingdom of Poland with the Polish language used in schools and local administration, to which eastern Silesia, Western Galicia and eastern Poznan would be attached after the war, and on 16 August 1914 he persuaded the Tsar that Russia should seek reintegration of a unified Polish state as one of its war aims.

In 1916, Germany, with the Act of 5th November, publicly promised to create the Regency Kingdom of Poland, while secretly planning to annex up to 35,000 square kilometres of its territory and ethnically cleanse up to 3 million Poles and Jews to make room for German settlers after the war. This caused the French parliament to comment that the manifesto "stamped the Polish question with an international character". Russia protested the move, as it saw its own rump Polish state, the Congress Kingdom (or Vistula Land) as the only "Poland" that mattered. Soon, however, the Russians followed the German move, and promised the Poles increased autonomy. This offer was mentioned in the United States in Woodrow Wilson's "Peace Without Victory" speech of 1917. The Polish question was temporarily solved with the restoration of Polish independence after World War I.

The term became once again relevant during World War II, as after the German invasion of Poland the future of occupied Poland became once again an issue of debate between the Great Powers of the time, namely the United Kingdom, the United States and the Soviet Union.

The term was also used later in the 20th century, in the 1980s during the Solidarność period, when opposition activists struggled to free the People's Republic of Poland from the domination of the Soviet Bloc.

See also
 Polish Independence Day commemorating the end to 123 years of partition
 The Troelfth Cake allegory for the First Partition of Poland
 Eastern question posed by the decay of the Ottoman Empire
 Armenian question, a similar topic about Armenians
 Jewish question pertaining to European Jews
 German question

References

Further reading
 Case, Holly. The Age of Questions (Princeton University Press, 2018)  excerpt

History of Poland (1795–1918)
Poland in World War II
Polish People's Republic
History of Europe
History of international relations
Political history of Poland
National questions